The NER Class U (LNER Class N10) was a class of 0-6-2 tank locomotives of the North Eastern Railway.  It was designed by Wilson Worsdell and introduced in 1902.

Use
The locomotives were used for shunting and on goods trains. All were fitted with Westinghouse brakes.

Numbering

The whole class was transferred from the NER to the London and North Eastern Railway (LNER) in 1923 and to British Railways (BR) in 1948. Numbers (where known) are shown below.

Withdrawal
One locomotive was withdrawn in 1948 and the remainder were withdrawn between 1955 and 1962. None is preserved.

References

0-6-2T locomotives
U
Railway locomotives introduced in 1902
Scrapped locomotives
Standard gauge steam locomotives of Great Britain

Freight locomotives